Halcombe is a small settlement in the Manawatū-Whanganui region of the North Island, New Zealand. It is situated 13 km north west of Feilding and 4 km east of the Rangitikei River, between State Highway 1 and State Highway 54.

Halcombe is situated on rolling hill country. The village centre is in a relatively low lying gully, with high hills to the west and low-lying hills to the east. The Halcombe area experiences a temperate climate which is similar to much of the Manawatu, with moderate wind and reasonable sunshine and rainfall; a good gardening climate. Frosts occur in winter, with one or two severe frosts each year due to the inland location. There are occasional fogs yearly.

The town has a pub, a public hall, a Rugby club, two tennis courts, a playground, public toilets and a rugby field. The pub featured briefly on a DB TV beer ad in the 1990s. A travelling circus large enough to own an elephant once set up on Halcombe rugby field. There is a dilapidated taxidermist's in the central area, Zentveld Taxidermy.

The North Island Main Trunk railway line runs through Halcombe, which had a station from 1878 to 1983.

History and culture

Pre-European history

The area was originally settled by hapū linked to Ngāti Raukawa.

European settlement

The European settlement was established in 1876 by the immigration agent Arthur Halcombe, who lived in nearby Feilding. The town was named after him, while the nearby locality of Stanway was named for his wife, Edith Stanway Halcombe (née Swainson). An 1880 plan shows that it was intended to be much larger than the present village.

Early European settlers included British and Germany families, followed by Danish settlers. Immigrants were given free passage and an acre of land in the Manchester Block, to provide labour for bush-felling and road construction, with larger blocks of land being made available from 1878. A Methodist church opened in 1876, followed by a Lutheran church in 1878.

The railway reached Halcombe in 1877, connecting through to Whanganui in 1878, allowing the town to become a thriving rural centre and the main railway junction in the central North Island. By the 1880s the town had reached its population peak, with four local schools. At one point, 35 trains passed through Halcome every day.

By 1897 the town's saw-milling industry was struggling due to a shortage of logs, but the community was wealthy due to well-performing farms. The town's railway station had a combined post and telegraph office and bank, and Anglican, Presbyterian, Catholic and Lutheran Churches.

20th century

Halcombe was intended to be the main centre of Manawatu, but an active riverbed on the Rangitikei River stopped further development. Land clearance and timer-milling gave way to farming, and the neighbouring towns of Feilding, Marton and Palmerston North took over as the main local centres.

A war memorial in the roundabout at the centre of the village commemorates the seven local men who died in World War I, and the nine local men who died in World War II.

The train station, which contained a post office and bar, burned down in 1962.

Marae

The local Tokorangi Marae and Te Tikanga meeting house is affiliated with the Ngāti Tūwharetoa hapū of Ngāti Waewae.

The area also has three Ngāti Raukawa marae:
 Te Hiiri o Mahuta Marae and meeting house are affiliated with Ngāti Matakore and Ngāti Rangatahi.
 Poupatatē Marae and meeting house are affiliated with Ngāti Pikiahuwaewae.
 Taumata o Te Rā Marae and Manomano meeting house are affiliated with Ngāti Manomano.

In October 2020, the Government committed $1,248,067 from the Provincial Growth Fund to upgrade the four Halcombe marae, as well as Kauwhata Marae and Parewahawaha Marae, creating 69 jobs.

Demographics

The population of Halcombe was 468 in the 2018 New Zealand census, an increase of 78 (20.0%) since the 2013 census, and an increase of 162 (52.9%) since the 2006 census. There were 225 males and 240 females, giving a sex ratio of 0.94 males per female. Ethnicities were 426 people  (91.0%) European/Pākehā, 72 (15.4%) Māori, 3 (0.6%) Pacific peoples, and 9 (1.9%) Asian (totals add to more than 100% since people could identify with multiple ethnicities). Of the total population, 96 people  (20.5%) were under 15 years old, 54 (11.5%) were 15–29, 252 (53.8%) were 30–64, and 63 (13.5%) were over 65.

Tokorangi

The Tokorangi statistical area, which also covers part of Cheltenham, had a population of 2,061 at the 2018 New Zealand census, an increase of 198 people (10.6%) since the 2013 census, and an increase of 363 people (21.4%) since the 2006 census. There were 744 households. There were 1,026 males and 1,035 females, giving a sex ratio of 0.99 males per female. The median age was 43.5 years (compared with 37.4 years nationally), with 432 people (21.0%) aged under 15 years, 291 (14.1%) aged 15 to 29, 1,029 (49.9%) aged 30 to 64, and 309 (15.0%) aged 65 or older.

Ethnicities were 91.1% European/Pākehā, 14.6% Māori, 1.2% Pacific peoples, 1.6% Asian, and 1.6% other ethnicities (totals add to more than 100% since people could identify with multiple ethnicities).

The proportion of people born overseas was 9.8%, compared with 27.1% nationally.

Although some people objected to giving their religion, 52.0% had no religion, 33.6% were Christian, 0.4% were Hindu and 3.3% had other religions.

Of those at least 15 years old, 309 (19.0%) people had a bachelor or higher degree, and 315 (19.3%) people had no formal qualifications. The median income was $36,900, compared with $31,800 nationally. The employment status of those at least 15 was that 927 (56.9%) people were employed full-time, 282 (17.3%) were part-time, and 42 (2.6%) were unemployed.

Education

Halcombe Primary School

The school was established in 1880 and quickly had to be expanded. The school moved to its current location in 1941.

The school gates commemorate 15 former students who served in World War I, and ten local men who served in World War II.

Mt Biggs Primary School

Mount Biggs School, another co-educational state primary school, is located south of Halcombe.

Former schools

Stanway School was established near Halcombe in 1882, and Tokorangi and Kakariki Schools were established nearby later in the 1880s.

All three schools were closed by the early 20th century.

Notable people
Kerri Gowler, New Zealand International rower
Jackie Gowler, New Zealand Junior rower
Lilian Gladys Tompkins, New Zealand nurse and prisoner of war

References

External links

 Halcombe War Memorial
 Early Picture of Halcombe
 Halcombe School

Manawatu District
Populated places in Manawatū-Whanganui